Todd Keith Barclay (born 8 June 1990) is a former New Zealand politician of the National Party. He was elected Member of Parliament (MP) for Clutha-Southland at the 2014 general election. In 2017, Barclay resigned from parliament in disgrace after a scandal involving secret recordings he made.

Early life
Barclay was born in 1990 in Dipton, where his parents Maree and Paul Barclay operated the Four Square supermarket. The family moved to Gore, where Barclay attended Gore High School, before graduating from Victoria University of Wellington with a Bachelor of Commerce in Commercial Law.

Prior to his election, Barclay worked at Parliament for Bill English (the MP he later replaced), Gerry Brownlee and Hekia Parata before moving to Auckland and working for Philip Morris. Barclay has insisted that with regards to working for a tobacco company, his ethics are strong: "I don't smoke, I don't encourage smoking".

Political career

Barclay won the election by a significant margin to Labour's Liz Craig, obtaining nearly 64% of the candidate votes. Barclay was the first New Zealand MP to be born in the 1990s and at the time of his election, at age 24 he was the youngest MP in the House of Representatives.

On 10 April 2015 Barclay featured in news media for criticising supporters of current affairs television show Campbell Live which had been threatened with cancellation. He subsequently deleted his Twitter comment.

In November 2016, media reports indicated that Queenstown resident Simon Flood intended to challenge Barclay for selection as the National candidate for Clutha-Southland at the 2017 election. At a party meeting on 21 December 2016 to select the candidate for the Clutha-Southland electorate in 2017, Barclay won the selection over challenger Simon Flood.

Clandestine recording scandal

On 9 February 2016, Glenys Dickson, a senior electorate agent for Barclay, resigned because of an "employment problem" between the two. Dickson, originally the electorate agent for Bill English from 1998 to 2014, became Barclay's agent in 2014 after he replaced Bill English as the MP for Clutha-Southland. The circumstances leading to her resignation were described as confidential. Later that month Stuart Davie, the Clutha-Southland chairman, became the third resignation of Barclay's staff in 2016, Barbara Swan being the first. Davie claimed it was "untenable" to stay on at present.

On 21 June 2017, after revelations that Barclay had made clandestine recordings of staff members he suspected of being critical of him, Barclay announced that he would not stand for re-election. Secretly recording a conversation that you are not party to is a crime in New Zealand. He subsequently left New Zealand and moved to London, later moving to Sydney.

References

|-

|-

Living people
People educated at Gore High School
New Zealand National Party MPs
Members of the New Zealand House of Representatives
1990 births
Victoria University of Wellington alumni
New Zealand MPs for South Island electorates
People from Dipton, New Zealand
21st-century New Zealand politicians